Petr Kanko (born 7 February 1984) is a professional ice hockey right winger who currently an Unrestricted Free Agent. He most recently played for the AZ Havířov of the 1. národní hokejová liga and formerly for the Los Angeles Kings of the NHL.

Playing career
Petr Kanko came to North America in 2001 to play for the Kitchener Rangers of the OHL. He produced for the team right away, and was part of their Memorial Cup winning team of 2003. Five members of that team, including Kanko, have since gone on to play in the NHL. Also, he was drafted 66th overall by the Los Angeles Kings in the 2002 NHL Entry Draft.

Kanko graduated from the Kitchener Rangers in 2004 after scoring 68 points in 55 games for them. He moved on to the Manchester Monarchs of the AHL. It took him a while to get his bearings in the pros, in part to his small stature, but in the 2005–06 season he played well enough to get called up to the Kings. In his first game in the NHL on 16 December 2005 against the Mighty Ducks of Anaheim, Kanko scored the game-tying goal in the third period that enabled the Kings to advance to the shootout, which they would win to take the game 4–3.

Career statistics

Regular season and playoffs

International

References

1984 births
Czech ice hockey right wingers
Kitchener Rangers players
HC Litvínov players
Living people
Los Angeles Kings draft picks
Los Angeles Kings players
Manchester Monarchs (AHL) players
HC Oceláři Třinec players
Orli Znojmo players
Sportspeople from Příbram
Reading Royals players
HC Slovan Ústečtí Lvi players
HC Sparta Praha players
Czech expatriate ice hockey players in Canada
Czech expatriate ice hockey players in the United States
Czech expatriate ice hockey players in Slovakia